Mohammad-Ali Angaji was an Iranian Shia cleric and politician. A loyal National Front member, he served as a member of parliament during the 17th term and ran for the 1954 election in Tehran. He was elected to the 73-seats Assembly of Experts for Constitution in 1979.

References
 Biography

1897 births
1984 deaths
Members of the Assembly of Experts for Constitution
Members of the 17th Iranian Majlis
National Front (Iran) MPs
Muslim People's Republic Party politicians
Shia clerics from Tabriz
Politicians from Tabriz
20th-century Iranian politicians